Lal Bahadur Shastri (2 October 1904 – 11 January 1966) was an Indian politician and statesman who served as the 2nd Prime Minister of India from 1964 to 1966 and 6th Home Minister of India from 1961 to 1963. He promoted the White Revolution – a national campaign to increase the production and supply of milk – by supporting the Amul milk co-operative of Anand, Gujarat and creating the National Dairy Development Board. Underlining the need to boost India's food production, Shastri also promoted the Green Revolution in India in 1965. This led to an increase in food grain production, especially in the states of Punjab, Haryana and Uttar Pradesh.

Shastri was born to Sharada Prasad Srivastava and Ramdulari Devi in Mughalsarai on 2 October 1904. He studied in East Central Railway Inter college and Harish Chandra High School, which he left to join the non-cooperation movement. He worked for the betterment of the Harijans at Muzaffarpur and dropped his caste-derived surname of "Srivastava". Shastri's thoughts were influenced by reading about Swami Vivekananda, Mahatma Gandhi and Annie Besant. Deeply impressed and influenced by Gandhi, he joined the Indian Independence movement in the 1920s. He served as the president of Servants of the People Society (Lok Sevak Mandal), founded by Lala Lajpat Rai and held prominent positions in Indian National Congress. Following independence in 1947, he joined the Indian government and became one of Prime Minister Nehru's key cabinet colleagues, first as Railways Minister (1951–56), and then in numerous other prominent positions, including the Home Minister.

He led the country during the Indo-Pakistan War of 1965. His slogan "Jai Jawan, Jai Kisan" ("Hail to the soldier; Hail to the farmer") became very popular during the war. The war formally ended with the Tashkent Agreement on 10 January 1966; he died the following day, still in Tashkent, with the cause of his death in dispute. He was posthumously awarded the Bharat Ratna.

Early years (1904–1920)
Shastri was born on 2 October 1904 at the home of his maternal grandparents in a Kayastha family. Shastri's paternal ancestors had been in the of the zamindar of Ramnagar near Banaras, and Shastri lived there for the first year of his life. Shastri's father, Sharada Prasad Srivastava, was a school teacher who later became a clerk in the revenue office at Allahabad, while his mother, Ramdulari Devi, was the daughter of Munshi Hazari Lal, the headmaster and English teacher at a railway school in Mughalsarai. Shastri was the second child and eldest son of his parents; he had an elder sister, Kailashi Devi (b. 1900).

In April 1906, when Shastri was hardly 18 months old, his father, who had only recently been promoted to the post of deputy tahsildar, died in an epidemic of bubonic plague. Ramdulari Devi, then only 23 years old and pregnant with her third child, took her two children and moved from Ramnagar to her father's house in Mughalsarai and settled there for good. She gave birth to a daughter, Sundari Devi, in July 1906. Thus, Shastri and his sisters grew up in the household of his maternal grandfather, Hazari Lalji. However, Hazari Lalji himself died from a stroke in mid-1908. Thereafter, the family was looked after by his brother (Shastri's great-uncle) Darbari Lal, who was the head clerk in the opium regulation department at Ghazipur, and later by his son (Ramdulari Devi's cousin) Bindeshwari Prasad, a school teacher in Mughalsarai.

This situation was perfectly in tune with the milieu of the times, where the Indian Joint family system was a thriving reality; the sense of family relationship and responsibility it fostered was the primary social security of the time. Nor should be surmised from these circumstances that Shastri grew up in an under-privileged manner, or that his education and comforts were compromised in any manner. On the contrary, since he was a rank student, he received a better education than some of his cousins. Then as now, education was highly prized in Kayastha families, and Bindeshwari Prasad, on the limited salary of a school teacher, with many dependents, nevertheless managed to give a good education to all the children in his care.

In 1917, Bindeshwari Prasad was transferred to Varanasi, and the entire family moved there, including Ramdulari Devi and her three children. In Varanasi, Shastri joining the seventh standard at Harish Chandra High School. At this time, he decided to drop his caste-derived surname of "Srivastava" (which is a traditional surname for a sub-caste of Kayastha families).

Gandhi's disciple (1921–1945)
While his family had no links to the independence movement then taking shape, among his teachers at Harish Chandra High School was an intensely patriotic and highly respected teacher named Nishkameshwar Prasad Mishra, who gave Shastri much-needed financial support by allowing him to tutor his children. Inspired by Mishra's patriotism, Shastri took a deep interest in the freedom struggle, and began to study its history and the works of several of its noted personalities, including those of Swami Vivekananda, Mahatma Gandhi and Annie Besant. In January 1921, when Shastri was in the 10th standard and three months from sitting the final examinations, he attended a public meeting in Benares hosted by Gandhi and Pandit Madan Mohan Malaviya. Inspired by the Mahatma's call for students to withdraw from government schools and join the non-cooperation movement, Shastri withdrew from Harish Chandra High School the next day and joined the local branch of the Congress Party as a volunteer, actively participating in picketing and anti-government demonstrations. He was soon arrested and jailed, but was then let off as he was still a minor.

Shastri's immediate supervisor was a former Benares Hindu University lecturer named J.B. Kripalani, who would become one of the most prominent leaders of the Indian independence movement and one among Gandhi's closest followers. Recognising the need for the younger volunteers to continue their educations, Kripalani and a friend, V.N. Sharma, had founded an informal school centered around "nationalist education" to educate the young activists in their nation's heritage and with the support of a wealthy philanthropist and ardent Congress nationalist, Shiv Prasad Gupta, the Kashi Vidyapith was inaugurated by Gandhi in Benares as a national institution of higher education on 10 February 1921. Among the first students of the new institution, Shastri graduated with a first-class degree in philosophy and ethics from the Vidyapith in 1925. He was given the title Shastri ("scholar"). The title was a bachelor's degree awarded by the institution but it stuck as part of his name.

Shastri enrolled himself as a life member of the Servants of the People Society (Lok Sevak Mandal), founded by Lala Lajpat Rai, and began to work for the betterment of the Harijans under Gandhi's direction at Muzaffarpur. Later he became the President of the Society.

Independence Activism of Lal Bahadur Shastri 
In 1928 Shastri became an active and mature member of the Indian National Congress at the call of Mahatma Gandhi. He was imprisoned for two and a half years. Later, he worked as the Organizing Secretary of the Parliamentary Board of U.P. in 1937. In 1940, he was sent to prison for one year, for offering individual Satyagraha support to the independence movement.

On 8 August 1942, Mahatma Gandhi issued the Quit India speech at Gowalia Tank in Bombay, demanding that the British leave India. Shastri, who had just then come out after a year in prison, travelled to Allahabad. For a week, he sent instructions to the independence activists from Jawaharlal Nehru's home, Anand Bhavan. He served as an elected representative for United Provinces in 1937 and 1946.

Political Career (1947–1964)

State minister
Following India's independence, Shastri was appointed Parliamentary Secretary in his home state, Uttar Pradesh. He became the Minister of Police and Transport under Govind Ballabh Pant's Chief Ministership on 15 August 1947 following Rafi Ahmed Kidwai's departure to become a minister at the centre. As the Transport Minister, he was the first to appoint women conductors. As the minister in charge of the Police Department, he ordered that police use water jets, whose instructions was given by him, instead of lathis to disperse unruly crowds. His tenure as police minister (As Home Minister was called prior to 1950) saw successful curbing of communal riots in 1947, mass migration and resettlement of refugees.

Cabinet minister

In 1951, Shastri was made the General Secretary of the All-India Congress Committee with Jawaharlal Nehru as the prime minister. He was directly responsible for the selection of candidates and the direction of publicity and electioneering activities. He played an important role in the landslide successes of the Congress Party in the Indian General Elections of 1952, 1957 and 1962. In 1952, he successfully contested UP Vidhansabha from Soraon North cum Phulpur West seat and won by getting over 69% of vote. He was believed to be retained as home minister of UP, but in a surprise move was called to Centre as minister by Nehru. Shastri was made Minister of Railways and Transport in First Cabinet of Republic of India on 13 May 1952. He served as the Minister of Commerce and Industry in 1959 and Minister of Home Affairs in 1961. Shastri laid the foundation of Mangalore Port in 1964 as a minister without a portfolio.

Prime minister (1964–1966)

Jawaharlal Nehru died in office on 27 May 1964. Then Congress Party president K. Kamaraj was instrumental in making Shastri prime minister on 9 June. Shastri, though mild-mannered and soft-spoken, was a Nehruvian socialist and thus held appeal to those wishing to prevent the ascent of conservative right-winger Morarji Desai.

In his first broadcast as prime minister, on 11 June 1964, Shastri stated:

Domestic policies
Shastri retained many members of Nehru's Council of Ministers. T. T. Krishnamachari was retained as the Finance Minister of India, as was Defence Minister Yashwantrao Chavan. He appointed Swaran Singh to succeed him as External Affairs Minister. He also appointed Indira Gandhi, daughter of Jawaharlal Nehru and former Congress President, as the Minister of Information and Broadcasting. Gulzarilal Nanda continued as the Minister of Home Affairs.

Lal Bahadur Shastri's tenure witnessed the Madras anti-Hindi agitation of 1965. The government of India had for a long time made an effort to establish Hindi as the sole national language of India. This was resisted by the non-Hindi speaking states particularly Madras State. To calm the situation, Shastri gave assurances that English would continue to be used as the official language as long the non-Hindi speaking states wanted. The riots subsided after Shastri's assurance, as did the student agitation.

Economic policies

Shastri continued Nehru's socialist economic policies with central planning. He promoted the White Revolution – a national campaign to increase the production and supply of milk – by supporting the Amul milk co-operative of Anand, Gujarat and creating the National Dairy Development Board. He visited Anand on 31 October 1964 for inauguration of the Cattle Feed Factory of Amul at Kanjari. As he was keenly interested in knowing the success of this co-operative, he stayed overnight with farmers in a village, and even had dinner with a farmer's family. He discussed his wish with Verghese Kurien, then the General Manager of Kaira District Co-operative Milk Producers' Union Ltd (Amul) to replicate this model to other parts of the country for improving the socio-economic conditions of farmers. As a result of this visit, the National Dairy Development Board (NDDB) was established at Anand in 1965.

While speaking on the chronic food shortages across the country, Shastri urged people to voluntarily give up one meal so that the food saved could be distributed to the affected populace. However, he ensured that he first implemented the system in his own family before appealing to the country. He went on air to appeal to his countrymen to skip a meal a week. The response to his appeal was overwhelming. Even restaurants and eateries downed the shutters on Monday evenings. Many parts of the country observed the "Shastri Vrat". He motivated the country to maximize the cultivation of food grains by ploughing the lawn himself, at his official residence in New Delhi. During the 22-day war with Pakistan in 1965, On 19 October 1965, Shastri gave the seminal 'Jai Jawan Jai Kishan' ("Hail the soldier, Hail the farmer") slogan at Urwa in Allahabad that became a national slogan. Underlining the need to boost India's food production, Shastri also promoted the Green Revolution in India in 1965. This led to an increase in food grain production, especially in Punjab, Haryana, and Uttar Pradesh. Major milestones in this undertaking were the development of high-yielding varieties of wheat, and rust resistant strains of wheat.

Though he was a socialist, Shastri stated that India cannot have a regimented type of economy. His government passed the National Agricultural Products Board Act and was responsible for setting up the Food Corporation of India under the Food Corporation's Act 1964.

Jai Jawan Jai Kisan

For the outstanding slogan given by him during Indo-Pak war of 1965 Ministry of Information and Broadcasting (India) commemorated Shastri even after 47 years of his death on his 48th martyr's day:

Foreign policies
Shastri continued Nehru's policy of non-alignment but also built closer relations with the Soviet Union. In the aftermath of the Sino-Indian War of 1962 and the formation of military ties between China and Pakistan, Shastri's government decided to expand the country's defence budget.
In 1964, Shastri signed an accorresponsibilities of local governments to provide adequate facilities to shelter the repatriates upon disembarkation on Indian soil. Particularly in the Madras State the Chief Minister during that time, Minjur K. Bhaktavatsalam, showed care in rehabilitation of the returnees. In December 1965, Shastri made an official visit with his family to Rangoon, Burma and re-established cordial relations with the country's military government of General Ne Win.

War with Pakistan
Shastri's greatest moment came when he led India in the 1965 Indo-Pak War. Laying claim to half the Kutch peninsula, the Pakistani army skirmished with Indian forces in August 1965. In his report to the Lok Sabha on the confrontation in Kutch, Shastri stated:

On 1 August 1965, major incursions of militants and Pakistani soldiers began, hoping not only to break down the government but incite a sympathetic revolt. The revolt did not happen, and India sent its forces across the Ceasefire Line (now Line of Control) and threatened Pakistan by crossing the International Border near Lahore as war broke out on a general scale. Massive tank battles occurred in the Punjab, and while the Pakistani forces made gains in the northern part of subcontinent, Indian forces captured the key post at Haji Pir, in Kashmir, and brought the Pakistani city of Lahore under artillery and mortar fire.

The Indo-Pak war ended on 23 September 1965 with a United Nations-mandated ceasefire. In a broadcast to the nation on the day of the ceasefire, Shastri stated:

During his tenure as prime minister, Shastri visited many countries including the Soviet Union, Yugoslavia, England, Canada, Nepal, Egypt and Burma. In October 1964 while returning from the Non Alliance Conference in Cairo, on the invitation of the-then president of Pakistan, Mohammed Ayub Khan, to have lunch with him, Shastri made a stopover at Karachi Airport for a few hours. Breaking with protocol, Ayub Khan personally received him at the airport and they had an informal meeting. After the ceasefire with Pakistan in 1965, Shastri and Ayub Khan attended a summit in Tashkent (former USSR, now in modern Uzbekistan), organized by Alexei Kosygin. On 10 January 1966, Shastri and Ayub Khan signed the Tashkent Declaration.

Family and personal life

Shastri was 5 ft 2 inches tall and always used to wear dhoti. The only occasion on which he wore pyjamas was dinner in honor of the Queen of the United Kingdom in 1961 in the Rashtrapati Bhavan. On 16 May 1928, Shastri married Lalita Devi who was from Mirzapur. The couple had four sons and two daughters, namely Kusum Shastri, the eldest daughter, Hari Krishna Shastri, the eldest son, Suman Shastri, whose son, Siddharth Nath Singh is a spokesman of the Bharatiya Janata Party and Minister of Health, Government of Uttar Pradesh, Anil Shastri who is a member of his father's Congress Party, his son Adarsh Shastri gave up his corporate career with Apple Inc to contest the General elections of 2014 from Allahabad on an Aam Aadmi Party ticket. He lost that election but was elected in 2015 as a member of the Delhi Legislative Assembly. Sunil Shastri who is a member of the Bharatiya Janata Party and Ashok Shastri, the youngest son who worked in the corporate world before his death at the age of 37, his wife Neera Shastri was a member of the Bharatiya Janata Party national executive. Other members of the family, have also been involved in the corporate and social life of India.

Death

Shastri died in Tashkent, Uzbekistan (then Soviet Union) on 11 January 1966, one day after signing a peace treaty to end the 1965 Indo-Pakistan War. Many among Shastri's supporters and close relatives, refused at the time, and have refused since, to believe the circumstances of his death and allege foul play. Conspiracy theories appeared within hours of his death and have thereafter persisted. He was eulogized as a national hero and the Vijay Ghat memorial established in his memory. Upon his death, Gulzarilal Nanda once again assumed the role of acting prime minister until the Congress Party elected Indira Gandhi over Morarji Desai to officially succeed Shastri.

After Shastri's death, his wife Lalita Shastri alleged he was poisoned. An epic poetry book in Hindi titled Lalita Ke Aansoo written by Krant M. L. Verma was published in 1978. In this book, the tragic story about the death of Shastri has been narrated by his wife Lalita. Journalist, conspiracy theorist, forger, and holocaust denier Gregory Douglas claimed to have conducted a series of interviews with CIA officer Robert Crowley in 1993. In a book published in 2013, 13 years after Crowley's death, Douglas wrote that Crowley euphemistically told him the CIA had assassinated Shastri, stating "And we nailed Shastri as well. Another cow-loving rag head", as well as Indian nuclear scientist Homi Bhabha thirteen days later in order to thwart the Indian nuclear programme. The Indian media proceeded to report these claims largely unquestioned.

The Indian Government released no information about his death and the media then was kept silent. The possible existence of a conspiracy was covered in India by the 'Outlook' magazine. A query was later posed by Anuj Dhar, author of CIA's Eye on South Asia, under the Right to Information Act to declassify a document supposedly related to Shastri's death, but the Prime Minister's Office refused to oblige, reportedly citing that this could lead to harming of foreign relations, cause disruption in the country and cause breach of parliamentary privileges. Another RTI plea by Kuldip Nayar was also declined, as PMO cited exemption from disclosure on the plea. The home ministry is yet to respond to queries whether India conducted a post-mortem on Shastri, and if the government had investigated allegations of foul play. The Delhi Police in their reply to an RTI application said they do not have any record pertaining to Shastri's death. The Ministry of External Affairs has already said no post-mortem was conducted in the USSR. The Central Public Information Officer of Delhi Police in his reply dated 29 July 2009 said, "No such record related to the death of the former prime minister of India Lal Bahadur Shastri is available in this district. Hence the requisite information pertaining to New Delhi district may please be treated as nil." This has created more doubts. The death of Lal Bahadur Shastri is considered to be one of the biggest unsolved mysteries of Indian politics.

The PMO answered only two questions of the RTI application, saying it has only one classified document pertaining to the death of Shastri, which is exempted from disclosure under the RTI Act. It sent the rest of the questions to the Ministry of External Affairs and Home Ministry to answer. The MEA said the only document from the erstwhile Soviet Government is "the report of the Joint Medical Investigation conducted by a team comprising R. N. Chugh, Doctor in-Attendance to the PM and some Russian doctors" and added no post-mortem was conducted in the USSR. The Home Ministry referred the matter to Delhi Police and National Archives for the response pertaining to any post-mortem conducted on the body of Shastri in India.

Legacy
Shastri was a secularist who refused to mix religion with politics. In a public meeting held at the Ram Lila grounds in Delhi, a few days after the ceasefire, he complained about a BBC report which claimed that Shastri's identity as a Hindu meant that he was ready for a war with Pakistan. He stated:

Kuldip Nayar, Shastri's media advisor from 1960 to 1964, recalls that, during the Quit India Movement, his daughter was ill and he was released on parole from jail. However, he could not save her life because doctors had prescribed costly drugs. Later on in 1963, on the day when he was dropped from the cabinet, he was sitting in his home in the dark, without a light. When asked about the reason, he said as he no longer is a minister, all expenses will have to be paid by himself and that as an MP and minister he didn't earn enough to save for time of need.

Although Shastri had been a cabinet minister for many years in the 1950s, he was poor when he died. All he owned at the end was an old car, which he had bought in instalments from the government and for which he still owed money. He was a member of Servants of India society (which included Mahatma Gandhi, Lala Lajpat Rai, Gopal Krishna Gokhle) which asked all its members to shun accumulation of private property and remain in public life as servants of the people. He was the first railway minister who resigned from office following a major train accident as he felt moral responsibility.

The foundation stone of Bal Vidya Mandir, a distinguished school of Lucknow, was laid by him during his tenure as the prime minister, on 19 November 1964. He inaugurated the Central Institute of Technology Campus at Tharamani, Chennai, in November 1964. He inaugurated the Plutonium Reprocessing Plant at Trombay in 1965. As suggested by Dr. Homi Jehangir Bhabha, Shastri authorized the development of nuclear explosives. Bhabha initiated the effort by setting up the nuclear explosive design group Study of Nuclear Explosions for Peaceful Purposes (SNEPP). He inaugurated the Andhra Pradesh Agricultural University at Hyderabad on 20 March 1965 which was renamed the Acharya N. G. Ranga Agricultural University in 1996 and was separated into two universities after the formation of Telangana State. The university in Telangana was named in July 2014 as Professor Jayashanker Agricultural University. Shastri also inaugurated the National Institute of Technology, Allahabad. Lal Bahadur Shastri inaugurated the Jawahar Dock of the Chennai Port Trust and started the construction work of V.O. Chidambaranar Port Authority in November 1964. He inaugurated the Sainik School Balachadi, in the state of Gujarat. He laid the foundation stone of Almatti dam. The commissioned dam bears his name.

Memorials

Shastri was known for his honesty and humility throughout his life. He was posthumously awarded the Bharat Ratna, and a memorial "Vijay Ghat" was built for him in Delhi. Several educational institutes including Lal Bahadur Shastri National Academy of Administration (Mussorie, Uttarakhand) bear his name. The Lal Bahadur Shastri Institute of Management was established in Delhi by the Lal Bahadur Shastri Educational Trust in 1995. The Shastri Indo-Canadian Institute was named after Shastri due to his role in promoting scholarly activity between India and Canada. Lal Bahadur Shastri Memorial run by the Lal Bahadur Shastri National Memorial Trust, is situated next to 10 Janpath his residence when he was prime minister, at 1, Motilal Nehru Place, New Delhi. One of the halls of residence of IIT Kharagpur is named after him as Lal Bahadur Shastri Hall of Residence.

In 2011, on Shastri's 45th death anniversary, the Uttar Pradesh Government announced the renovation of Shastri's ancestral house at Ramnagar in Varanasi and declared plans to convert it into a biographical museum. Varanasi International Airport is named after him. The Lal Bahadur Shastri Centre for Indian Culture with a monument and a street named after him are in the city of Tashkent, Uzbekistan. A few stadiums are named after him in the cities of Hyderabad, Telangana, Ahmedabad in Gujarat, Kollam in Kerala, Ghazhiabad and Bhawanipatna in Odisha. The Almatti Dam across the River Krishna in northern Karnataka was renamed the Lal Bahadur Shastri Sagar. The foundation stone was laid by him. MV Lal Bahadur Shastri, a cargo ship, is named after him. The Reserve Bank of India released coins in the denomination of 5 rupees during his birth century celebrations. An All India Lal Bahadur Shastri Hockey tournament has been held every year since 1991 – it is a major hockey tournament. The Left Bank Canal of the Nagarjuna Sagar Dam in Andhra Pradesh is named the Lal Bahadur Shastri Canal and is 295 km in Length.
 
Some major roads in the cities of New Delhi, Mumbai, Pune, Puduchery, Lucknow, Warangal and Allahabad and Ernakulam are named after him, as is Sashtri Road, Kottayam, Kerala. There is a Lal Bahadur Shastri Medical College in Mandi, Himachal Pradesh and Shastri Bhavans in New Delhi, Chennai and Lucknow. In 2005, the Government of India created a chair in his honour in the field of democracy and governance at Delhi University.

A portrait of Shastri hangs in the Central Hall of the Parliament House of India. The portrait, painted by Vidya Bhushan, was unveiled by the then President of India, Dr. Shanker Dayal Sharma on 2 October 1993.

In popular culture 
Shastri's life and death, in particular, have been a subject of Indian popular culture. Homage to Lal Bahadur Shastri is a 1967 short documentary film directed by S. Sukhdev and produced by the Films Division of India which pays tribute to the former prime minister. Apne Shastri Ji (1986) was also made as a homage to him.

Jai Jawaan Jai Kisaan is a 2015 Indian Hindi-language biographical drama film by Milan Ajmera, titled after the popular slogan by Shastri it portrays his entire life from birth to death where he is portrayed by Akhilesh Jain. Lal Bahadur Shastri's Death, a 2018 television documentary film by Jyoti Kapur Das reconstructs his death and covers various conspiracy theories around it, including interviews with his son Sunil Shastri. A film titled The Tashkent Files (2019), directed by Vivek Agnihotri revolves around the mystery of the death of Lal Bahadur Shastri.

Pradhanmantri, a 2013 Indian documentary television series which aired on ABP News and covers the various policies and political tenures of Indian PMs, dedicated the entire seventh episode "Lal Bahadur Shastri" to his term as the country's leader with Akhil Mishra in the role of Shastri.

The 1967 film Upkar by Manoj Kumar, which is based on the 1965 war, was dedicated to Shastri. Lal Bahadur Shastri, a 2014 Indian Malayalam-language comedy film by Rejishh Midhila is titled after the prime minister but has no apparent connection with his life.

See also
 List of prime ministers of India
 List of unsolved deaths

References

Footnotes

Citations

Sources

Further reading

 Guha, Ramachandra. India After Gandhi: The History of the World's Largest Democracy (2007 ) pp 390–405.
 Mankekar, Dinker Rao. Lal Bahadur A Political Biography (Popular Prakashan; Bombay, 1965)  online.
 Srivastava,  C.P.  Lal Bahadur Shastri: a life of truth in politics (New Delhi: Oxford University Press, 1995) 
 Gujrati, Balwant Singh, ed. A Study of Lal Bahadur Shastri (Sterling Publishers, 1966).
 Pavan Choudary and Anil Shastri. Lal Bahadur Shastri: Lessons in Leadership. Wisdom Village Publications, 2014 
 John Noyce. Lal Bahadur Shastri: an English-language bibliography. Lulu.com, 2002.
 Shastri, Lal Bahadur. "Selected Speeches of Lal Bahadur Shastri, June 11, 1964 to January 10, 1966." (1974).
 Lal Bahadur Shastri, 'Reflections on Indian politics', Indian Journal of Political Science, vol.23, 1962, pp1–7
 Lal Bahadur Shastri, The Fight For Peace The Long Road To Tashkent  (1966) online
 L.P. Singh, Portrait of Lal Bahadur Shastri (Delhi: Ravi Dayal Publishers, 1996) 
 (Sir) C.P. Srivastava, Corruption: India's enemy within (New Delhi: Macmillan India, 2001) chapter 3 
 India Unbound From Independence to Global Information Age by Shri Gurucharan Das chapter 11
 The spiritual master of Sri Lal Bahadur Shastri was Sri Sri Thakur Anukulchandra Chakravarty.

External links

 
 
 Tears of Lalita. Krant M. L. Verma.

|-

|-

|-

1904 births
1966 deaths
India MPs 1957–1962
India MPs 1962–1967
Commerce and Industry Ministers of India
20th-century prime ministers of India
Indian Hindus
Indian independence activists from Uttar Pradesh
Leaders of the Rajya Sabha
Lok Sabha members from Uttar Pradesh
Ministers for External Affairs of India
People from Allahabad district
People from Chandauli district
People from Uttar Pradesh
Politicians from Varanasi
Prime Ministers of India
Prisoners and detainees of British India
Shastri administration
Railway Ministers of India
Rajya Sabha members from Uttar Pradesh
Recipients of the Bharat Ratna
Unsolved deaths
Conspiracy theories in India
Death conspiracy theories